Alfred James Sabin (7 April 1905 – 1982) was an English footballer who played in the First Division of the Football League for Birmingham.

Sabin was born in Oldbury, which was then part of Worcestershire. Described as an attacking wing half, he had been playing for Accles & Pollock's works team when given a run-out in Birmingham's last two games of the 1929–30 season, making his debut in a 1–1 draw away to Sheffield Wednesday on 28 April 1930. He was not kept on, and returned to non-league football with Oldbury United and Leamington Town.

References

1905 births
1982 deaths
People from Oldbury, West Midlands
English footballers
Association football wing halves
Birmingham City F.C. players
Oldbury United F.C. players
Leamington F.C. players
English Football League players
Date of death missing
Place of death missing